WAHC may refer to:

 WJYD, a radio station (107.1 FM) licensed to serve Circleville, Ohio, United States, which held the call sign WAHC from 1993 to 1997
 WWWX, a radio station (96.7 FM) licensed to serve Oshkosh, Wisconsin, United States, which held the call sign WAHC from 1980 to 1989
 World Aquatic Health Conference sponsored by the National Swimming Pool Foundation